Amorino is a French multinational chain of gelato boutiques headquartered outside of Paris, France. The company was founded in 2002 by Cristiano Sereni and Paolo Benassi, two childhood friends from Reggio Emilia.

The first boutique opened on Île Saint-Louis in 2002 and has grown in a competitive market, offering gelato and sorbetto made according to Italian tradition. As of July 2021, the company had more than 200 stores in Europe, Asia, the United States, and Mexico and typically serves gelato in the shape of a flower. Amorino boutiques additionally offer macarons, crêpes, waffles, tarts, milkshakes , and Italian-style coffee.

History 

 The first Amorino boutique opened in 2002 on the Île Saint-Louis in Paris, France.
 In 2005, gelato production was centralized in one laboratory.
 In 2006, the franchise-based expansion was launched.
 In 2009, the first boutique outside of France opened.
 In 2011, headquarters and the central laboratory were relocated to Orly, France. This year also marked the expansion of Amorino to the U.S. in New York.
 In 2015, all Amorino sorbets received the Vegan Society certification.
 In 2016, Amorino opened the 150th boutique in Playa del Carmen, Mexico on the world-renowned Quinta Avenida.
 In 2017, all gelato and sorbets became gluten-free.
 In 2019, Amorino opened its 18th market.
 In 2020, Amorino opened the 200th store, again in Mexico, on the iconic Angel of Independence roundabouts in Mexico City.

References

Further reading

External links

 

Ice cream parlors
Food and drink companies of France
Restaurants established in 2002
Companies based in Île-de-France
French brands